Tori Nicole Paul (born 22 August 2002) is an American-born Trinidad and Tobago footballer who plays as a midfielder for the Maryland Terrapins and as a forward for the Trinidad and Tobago women's national team.

International career
Paul played for Trinidad and Tobago at senior level in the 2019 CONCACAF Women's Olympic Qualifying Championship qualification. She has also made appearances for the u20 Trinidad and Tobago Women's team in the 2020 and 2022 CONCACAF Women's Championship World Cup Qualifiers.

References

External links

2002 births
Living people
Women's association football forwards
Women's association football fullbacks
Trinidad and Tobago women's footballers
Trinidad and Tobago women's international footballers
American women's soccer players
Soccer players from Richmond, Virginia
Sportspeople from Richmond, Virginia
Soccer players from Charlotte, North Carolina
African-American women's soccer players
American sportspeople of Trinidad and Tobago descent
Maryland Terrapins women's soccer players
21st-century African-American sportspeople
21st-century African-American women